Dror Benshetrit is an Israeli artist, designer and inventor based in New York City. He opened his studio Dror in 2002 in New York and focuses on product, interior, installation and architectural design. His major works include a structural support system named Quadror, the masterplan of Galataport in Istanbul, Turkey, and the Cappellini Peacock chair. His studio partners with top tier companies, developers, and institutions including but not limited to Alessi, Bentley, Tumi, Levi's, Boffi, Louis Vuitton, and Target. Dror's work is in the permanent collections of major museums in North America, Europe and the Middle East, including the Metropolitan Museum of Art.

The firm's first architectural project consisted of a high-end residential masterplan for Nurai, a private island off the coast of Abu Dhabi. Dror designed 24 beachfront villas covered by a carpet of grass. The 49 properties sold in 72 hours before construction had even begun, and the project was dubbed the “Most Luxurious in the World” by Newsweek Magazine.

Early life 
During his academic career, he grew interested in and inspired by the work of Isamo Noguchi, Achille Castiglioni, and Buckminster Fuller. At age 25, he moved to New York City and opened his studio. His first commercial product, The Vase of Phases, is a vase that appears to be shattered and then put back together, symbolizing the processes and experiences humans go through which shape them into who they are. Manufactured by Rosenthal, the product went on to become the recipient of the 2006 IF product design award.

Key works

Vase of Phases (2005) 
 Brought to life by the German porcelain company Rosenthal, Dror's design for the Vase of Phases now belongs to the permanent collections of the State Museum for Applied Arts in Munich, Eretz Israel Museum in Tel Aviv, and Museum of Arts and Design in New York. Inspired by the fear of breaking beautiful things, the design resembles a snapshot of a vase as it is exploding. It comes in both black and white, and quickly became one of the company's best-selling products.

Peacock Chair (2009) 
 Dror is perhaps best known for designing the Peacock Chair, which famously appeared as Rihanna’s throne in her music video for "S&M". Manufactured by Italian furniture brand Cappellini, the chair consists of three layers of felt folded and held in place with a simple metal frame. The Peacock Chair is made without using modern upholstery techniques or glues.

Nurai (2008) 
 The masterplan for Nurai, a tropical island off of the coast of Abu Dhabi, features twelve water villas that complement twenty-four land villas. Aware that the targeted clientele owned multiple homes across the globe, Dror attempted to distinguish his designs by creating a heightened feeling of privacy and maintaining access to community. This was achieved by covering the roofs of the complex with a singular vegetative carpet, sheltering inhabitants from their neighbors while also providing open space for socialization. Once fully completed in 2014, the project sold for a total of $1 billion.

Havvada (2012) 
 Using the dirt excavated to construct a canal between the Black Sea and the Sea of Marmara in Turkey, Dror envisioned building a man-made island off the coast of Istanbul. Named Havaada, the island conceptualized consists of six dome hills that surround an inverted mound in the center. Dror explores a 3D urban grid, designing a series of domes wrapped by residences. Each dome houses a different activity center, with cable cars and walkways connecting them to each other as well as to the downtown center. The micro-environment aims to address the social, environmental, and economic issues affecting today's contemporary cities.

TUMI (2012) 
 In 2012 Dror joined with Tumi to create a collection of travel bags. He designed the world's first expandable carry-on suitcase, which had the ability to double in size, as well as a backpack, travel satchel, dopp kit, and more. The fusion of technology and luxury details proved very successful, and Dror later collaborated with Tumi to redesign their retail experience. The design approach for the flagship store on Madison Avenue in New York City has now been implemented in over 50 locations around the world.

QuaDror (2006) 
 Through experimentation in the workshop, Dror discovered a structural support system which he later named QuaDror. This patented proprietary structural technology serves as a foundation for a range of the studio's projects. The interlocking L-shaped pieces are stackable and load-bearing, allowing them to adapt to all sorts of conditions, scales and configurations.

Swarovski (2007) 
 One of the many applications of QuaDror was in a partnership with Swarovski for a floor chandelier. The piece consists of the QuaDror framing with a grid of signature swarovski crystal strands.  The chandelier can be propped open up to form two parabolas of crystals and is purposefully designed to stand on the floor rather than hang from the ceiling.

Materialise (2009) 
 By collaborating with the Belgian 3D printing innovator, Materialise, Dror was able to manufacture and test the QuaDror structure on another level. The result of the collaboration was a kinetic cube named Volume.MGX, a piece created by 1,200 tiny laser cut QuaDror structures. Once printed, the cube can be expanded to fit a source of light at the center, resulting in a lamp that emits a unique glow.

Brancott Estate (2017) 
 Dror designed a sculptural installation for the New Zealand-based Brancott Estate, the pioneer of Marlborough Sauvignon Blanc since 1975. The installation adopts the QuaDror modular system to form a geometric shape that reflects the shape of the grapevines. The design is intended to mirror the uniformity of the beautiful Marlborough landscape. To give visitors a piece of the sculpture to take home, Dror also designed a scaled-down version of the installation that could serve as a wine rack for up to six bottles of wine.

Galataport Masterplan (2014) 
 The team of Dror and Gensler won a competition to redesign Galataport, a site on the Bosphorus in the heart of Istanbul. The idea is to create the world's first underground cruise-ship terminal. With the help of Miami firm BEA, the team was able to invent a 3.5 meter hydraulic boardwalk and gangway system that hatches open when a ship docks. Above ground, Dror and Gensler created a multi-layered pedestrian neighborhood with a range of mixed-use buildings. This new public space seeks to help connect the city and sea, as well as provide space for bustling activity and newfound waterfront views.

Tron Chair (2010) 
 The Tron Chair, designed by Dror and manufactured by Cappellini, is inspired by the Tron: Legacy film. It reflects on the angular terrain of the Disney film, playing with the collision of shapes in the digital world.

Exhibitions 
 2015- Wanted Design: QuaDror furniture
 2017- Bozar Centre for Fine Arts: Volume.MGX
 2015- Guggenheim Helsinki
 2014- Museo Poldi Pezzoli Milan: Peacock Chair
 2011- Metropolitan Museum of Art: Peacock Chair
 2011- Interni: QuaDror geometry

Awards 
Miami Lift Award
 2013: winner of Miami Landmark idea competition
Red Dot Award in Product Design
 2010: QuaDror 03 table in mocha stained ash
 2013: Dror for Tumi International Expandable Carry-On
Good Design Award
 2008: Dror for Boffi +/- cabinet
 2010: Dror for Alessi Try it Trivet
IF Product Design Award
 2006: Dror for Rosenthal Vase of Phases

Talks 
 2014: PennDesign
 2013: India Design Forum
 2011: What Design Can Do
 2011: Design Indaba
 2017: C2 Montreal

References

External links
Studio Dror website

Living people
Year of birth missing (living people)
Artists from New York City
Design Academy Eindhoven alumni
Israeli people
Israeli people of Moroccan-Jewish descent
Futurist architects
Product designers
Futurist artists
Futurism
Israeli inventors